Catherine McKenney (born June 3, 1961) is a Canadian politician who served on Ottawa City Council from 2014 to 2022, representing Somerset Ward. McKenny did not seek re-election as councillor in the 2022 Ottawa election, instead running for mayor of Ottawa and finishing second. Before running for office, they worked as an advisor and political staffer.

Early life and education
McKenney was born in Fort-Coulonge, Quebec, the child of a forester and stay-at-home parent. The family would then move to Sturgeon Falls, Ontario, where McKenney went to elementary school. In grade 9, McKenney moved to Pembroke, Ontario when their dad got a job at Algonquin College. McKenney had two children in their early 20s, working in fast food and as a photographer's assistant to support them. McKenney moved to Ottawa at the age of 26, where they completed a Bachelor of Social Science at the University of Ottawa in 1993. After graduating, McKenney lived in Kanata and had a job reading news articles on television for people who are blind.

Political career 
Prior to holding elected office, McKenney worked as a staffer in the offices of city councillors Diane Holmes and Alex Munter, and federal members of Parliament Ed Broadbent and Paul Dewar. They supported Jim Watson in the 2014 mayoral election.

McKenney was first elected in the 2014 municipal election to represent Somerset Ward, which consists of Centretown, Centretown West, and the downtown core.

During the 2022 Canada convoy protests, McKenney criticized inaction by Ottawa Mayor Jim Watson and the Ottawa Police Service. McKenney virtually joined an Ottawa City Council meeting from the streets of the occupation.

In December 2021, McKenney announced that they would be running for mayor in the 2022 Ottawa municipal election.

Personal life 
McKenney is queer and is the first non-male openly-LGBT person to serve on Ottawa's city council. They are non-binary and use they/them pronouns. They have three children.

Electoral record

2022 Ottawa municipal election

2018 Ottawa municipal election

2014 Ottawa municipal election

References

External links
 

1961 births
Ottawa city councillors
Living people
LGBT municipal councillors in Canada
People from Outaouais
21st-century Canadian politicians
21st-century Canadian LGBT people
Non-binary politicians
People from West Nipissing
People from Pembroke, Ontario
University of Ottawa alumni